Poor Jenny (German:Die arme Jenny) is a 1912 German silent film directed by Urban Gad and starring Asta Nielsen, Leo Peukert and Emil Albes.

The film's sets were designed by the art director Robert A. Dietrich.

Cast
 Asta Nielsen as Jenny Schmidt  
 Leo Peukert as Eduard Reinhold  
 Emil Albes as Werkmeister Schmidt  
 Hans Staufen as Kellner Fritz Hellmann  
 Paula Helmert as Frau Schmidt  
 Ferdinand Richter as Kommis  
 Berhold Weiss as Kellner  
 Max Obal
 Bruno Lopinski 
 Helene Voß

References

Bibliography
 Jennifer M. Kapczynski & Michael D. Richardson. A New History of German Cinema.

External links

1912 films
Films of the German Empire
Films directed by Urban Gad
German silent short films
German black-and-white films
1910s German films